Piotrcovia Piotrków Trybunalski is a women's Polish handball team, based in Piotrków Trybunalski.

Current squad 
Squad for the 2018–19 season

Goalkeepers
1  Natalia Kolasińska
 16  Daria Opelt 
 69  Karolina Sarnecka

Wingers
LW
5  Marta Osuch
 51  Vladyslava Belmas 
 57  Zuzanna Gajewska 
RW 
 19  Patrycja Ciura
 10  Aleksandra Zaleśny 
Line players 
7  Sylwia Klonowska
 29  Andleja Ivanović

Back players
LB
 11  Monika Kopertowska
 23  Klaudia Cygan
 55  Zorica Despodovska
CB
 15  Agata Wypych
 17  Anna Wasilewska
 22  Kinga Gutkowska
RB
8  Żaneta Senderkiewicz
 73  Kornelia Małecka

References

See also
 Handball in Poland
 Sports in Poland

Polish handball clubs
Piotrków Trybunalski
Sport in Łódź Voivodeship